The PNR Metro Commuter Line is a commuter rail line operated by the Philippine National Railways. It was first inaugurated as the Metro Manila Commuter Service in 1970, and originally served the North Main Line and the South Main Lines, as well as the defunct Carmona and Guadalupe branch lines. Since then, it adopted several names such as Metrotrak and Metrotren, before adopting its present name in the late 2000s. The line is also nicknamed the Orange Line due to its designation in the 1970s.

The present line has 36 stations serving Metro Manila and Laguna. It is divided into two sections which meet in Tutuban station in Tondo, Manila. The Metro North Commuter section runs from Tutuban to Governor Pascual station in Malabon and is colored light green in the system map of PNR. On the other hand, the Metro South Commuter section which runs from Tutuban to IRRI station in Los Baños, Laguna and is colored orange. Some stations connect to LRT Lines 1 and 2, and MRT Line 3.

History

Manila Railroad local trains and Meralco Tranvias

The Manila Railroad Company, which preceded PNR, operated various local trains between Manila and its neighboring provinces. Trains from Tutuban will lead to Naic in Cavite, Pagsanjan in Laguna, Montalban in Rizal, and Bulacan during the 1920s.

The Manila Electric Railroad and Light Company (Meralco) also operated electrified Tranvia services in what is now Metro Manila. The  tram system reached Malabon to the north, Pasig to the east, and Libertad (now part of Pasay) to the south, making it one of the longest in Asia in 1924. Both systems were heavily damaged during the Battle of Manila in World War II.

PNR commuter services

Metro Manila Commuter Service (1970–89)
The Metro Manila Commuter Service started on April 6, 1970, which started at Manila North Harbor and ended in Biñan, Laguna. During this decade, more stations were opened although some were either closed or relocated. In 1976, the commuter system peaked and extended as far north as San Fernando, Pampanga, Guadalupe (located in Mandaluyong on the other side of Pasig River) to the east, and College to the south. There were also services in the now-defunct Carmona branch line.

Metrotrak then Metrotren (1989–2009)
In 1990, the system was undergoing renovations under the working title Metrotrak. By May of that year, the system was inaugurated as Metrotren to distinguish it from the LRT Line 1, then named "Metrorail". However, the Metrotren system eventually suffered neglect due to lack of funding and maintenance. Plans for expansion and rehabilitation such as the Manila–Clark rapid railway project and Guadalupe line revival was also never realized.

Post-Metrotren and Metro Commuter

The Arroyo administration attempted to modernize the PNR system by rebuilding the lines and purchasing new rolling stock. PNR purchased 6 brand new diesel multiple units from South Korea and became its first order in 35 years. The government was also interested in reviving the Manila to Malolos NorthRail project. However, the line stopped construction in 2011 and only pillars were built. The succeeding Aquino administration rebuilt the stations along the line to accommodate high-floor trains. PNR also acquired second-hand multiple units from Japan as stopgap measures to its train fleet, ending the Metrotren era. However, services were further suspended to Santa Rosa in 2014, and to Alabang in 2015 due to safety issues and accidents on the line. The North Main Line has also been closed.

The Duterte administration, Department of Transportation Secretary Arthur Tugade, and PNR General Manager Junn Magno, all promised to revive and modernize the PNR and its commuter line. In 2017, the Department of Science and Technology announced its first Filipino-designed train and started trial services between Alabang and Calamba in 2018.

For the present network, Magno announced the purchase of 3 diesel-hydraulic locomotives, 15 coaches, and 6 sets of diesel multiple units from Indonesian rolling stock manufacturer PT Industri Kereta Api or INKA. The INKA trainsets and 5 of the Hyundai Rotem DMUs will comprise a 14-train fleet that will replace the aging PNR 900 class as well as the second-hand rolling stock acquired by the Aquino administration, as these trainsets will be transferred to the Bicol Region for the Bicol Commuter services after 2020. The present line will also be rebuilt during and after the construction of the North–South Commuter Railway as it will serve as an alternate transport mode to the NSCR. It will be eventually envisioned to revisit and reactivate once abandoned lines and stations in the north that was once operated by PNR.

Planned closure
On February 16, 2023, DOTr announced the suspension of operations of the PNR system, along with the Metro Commuter services, to give way for the construction of the North–South Commuter Railway. The northern section of the line is expected to close by May 2023, while the entire line will be closed by October 2023.

Route

The existing operational Metro Commuter Line is predominantly aligned and shares the path of the PNR South Main Line or SouthRail which uses a dedicated right of way of its own. It terminates at Calamba Station despite having rails further towards Legazpi, Albay, but few trains stop at Sta. Rosa and Calamba Stations further to the south. Inter-provincial services such as the Bicol Express and Mayon Limited are not running as of 2015, but plans to revive the services have been presented.

 Legend
 Trains stop at stations marked "●".
 Trains pass those marked "｜".
 Only morning and evening trains stop at stations marked "◇".
 Morning and evening trains stopping only on Sundays at stations marked "X".
 Evening southbound trains only load at stations marked "♦".
 Morning and evening trains only unload at stations marked "♠".
 For AA-LA-IRRI, some trains stop at stations marked ∆, while all trains stop at stations marked ✓
  closed stations
 MSC (TU-LA) — Metro South Commuter (Tutuban to Calamba)
MSC (TU-IRRI) — Metro South Commuter (Tutuban to IRRI)
MSC (AA-LA-IRRI) — Metro South Commuter (Alabang-Calamba- IRRI)
MNC (TU-GP) — Metro North Commuter (Tutuban to Governor Pascual)
MNC (GP-FTI) — Metro North Commuter (Governor Pascual to FTI)
 SS (TU-SU) — Shuttle Service (Tutuban to Sucat)
 SS (SA-SU) — Shuttle Service (Santa Mesa to Sucat)
 PT — Premiere Train

The line is open from 4:29 a.m. PHT (UTC+8) until 9:42 p.m. on a daily basis. It operates almost every day of the year unless otherwise announced. Special schedules via the social media pages of the PNR and also in newspapers and other mass media. During Holy Week, a public holiday in the Philippines, the line is closed for annual maintenance, owing to fewer commuters and traffic around the metro. Normal operation resumes on Easter Sunday.

Existing infrastructure

Station layout
All stations are presently at-grade, with most stations using a side platform layout. Most have only basic amenities, platforms and ticket booths. Rehabilitated stations along the Metro Manila line have been fitted with ramps for passengers using wheelchairs. Several stations have extended platforms, having an upper platform catering to DMU services, and a lower platform for regular locomotive-hauled services. As of August 2017, most of the stations are being extended and equipped with platform-length roofing, better ticketing office, and restrooms.

Signalling
An automatic block signalling system by Mitsui was employed in the line as stated in a 1977 magazine by the International Railway Journal. However, a presentation published in 2015 by the Department of Transportation and Communications stated that there is no signalling in the line.

The contract was awarded to PT Len Railway Systems of Indonesia in April 2022, and the contract was signed on May 19. PT Len Railway Systems will supply their SiLSafe 4000 computer-based interlocking system. The project is expected to be completed within 16 months after the contract signing, or until September 2023.

Communications
Prior to the uprade, the communications system backbone consisted of VHF radios, augmented with land and mobile phones. It was a localized system with no repeater stations. From 2020 to 2022, the communications system was digitalized and computerized. In 2020, the PNR tapped Hytera to upgrade the system's communication system to a two-way radio system. The TETRA digital radio system, which is currently being used in the line, enables faster coordination in depot personnel and has a network management system, allowing tasks to be centralized and handled seamlessly. The upgrade was completed in February 2022.

Tracks
The tracks are built to the  narrow gauge. The existing tracks are ballasted, with the rails laid on wooden and concrete railroad ties. The existing tracks consist of  rails.

Rolling stock

The PNR Metro Commuter Line has always used diesel-powered rolling stock since the services were opened in 1970. In 1976, PNR was able to expand its commuter and regional services when it bought 60 CMC railcars which remained in service until 2004. These commuter trainsets however deteriorated in the 1990s and ordered second-hand 12 series coaches in their stead. The 12 series cars were hauled by PNR's diesel locomotives which were previously used in its intercity and freight services. There were no new orders until 2009 when PNR ordered the Hyundai Rotem DMUs, followed by second-hand multiple units and coaches from Japan.

PNR later ordered 2 new trains from Indonesian manufacturer PT INKA on January 22, 2018, followed by an order of 7 more trains on May 28, increasing the total trains ordered to 9. The DOST Hybrid Electric Train also entered trial service the same year. The agency then commenced the refurbishment of its entire fleet the following year, which introduced polycarbonate windows that can resist stoning as well as a new livery.

Active

Former

Services

Current

Metro South Commuter
The Metro South Commuter (also known as MSC) is the main and only train service currently being offered by PNR that run along the Metro Commuter Line. The trains that are currently being used for this service are the 900 and 2500 class diesel-electric locomotives, ex-Joban Line 203 series EMUs donated by JR East, the South Korean Hyundai Rotem DMUs, the PT INKA 8000 class DMUs, INKA 8100 class DMUs, and the INKA CC300 locomotives and 8300 class coaches. The 8000 class DMUs occasionally perform MSC trips when the Hyundai Rotem DMUs occupy the Metro North Commuter trips. The trips are reduced upon announcements. On December 2, 2014, the new Calamba Station was inaugurated. Later that night, the MSC1907 was extended up to the said station. The MSC1937 was also extended, but only up to Santa Rosa Station. 

Metro North Commuter
On August 1, 2018, Philippine National Railways reinstated commuter train services to Caloocan station, as preparation for the Tutuban-Malolos railway, the first section of the North–South Commuter Railway line that will end at Clark in Pampanga. The line was reopened after the line was repaired due to water intrusion. According to claims by the Department of Transportation, it will be the most efficient way of travel between Caloocan and Makati. Services will continue operating until the completion of the Tutuban-Malolos Railway, after which the line will be mostly dedicated to cargo hauling. Originally running from 10th Avenue to Dela Rosa, it was upgraded into the Caloocan-FTI shuttle service on September 10 (officially called the Sangangdaan-FTI shuttle service). On December 3, 2018, it was again extended to Acacia/Governor Pascual station, with plans to extend the service up to Valenzuela railway station, and poised to carry 120,000 passengers daily if completed.

Trains servicing the Metro North Commuter service from Governor Pascual to FTI and vice versa usually stop at limited stations. Since 2019, trains servicing the MNC services now stop at all stations.

The trains used in this service are the INKA 8000 class and Hyundai Rotem diesel multiple units.

Past
Prior to the establishment of the PNR Metro Commuter Line, the Manila Railroad had several local train services in the 1950s and 1960s. According to a timetable that was effected on August 16, 1954, local trains on the South Main Line from Manila reached Lucena station in Quezon province. In the 1960s, local trains also reached San Fernando, Pampanga on the North Main Line. Services on the South Main Line were also added in the province of Laguna, and reached San Pablo and Santa Cruz, Laguna.

Caloocan–Meycauayan section
After the intercity section of the North Main Line was closed in the 1980s, then-president Corazon Aquino inaugurated the resumption of commuter rail services to Meycauayan in Bulacan on May 10, 1990. It was part of the Metrotren program initiated by then-Department of Transportations and Communications secretary Oscar Orbos to revitalize Metro Manila's public transport infrastructure due to worsening car traffic in the metropolis. The line was closed in the midst of the 1997 Asian financial crisis. There were plans to revitalize the entire line and extend it to Laoag.

This section eventually became the PNR Metro North Commuter. The network shall extend again to Valenzuela City once a bridge crossing the Tullahan River has been constructed. However, the North–South Commuter Railway will serve as the primary commuter rail service to Bulacan and neighboring Ilocos Norte, with the PNR Metro North Commuter allotted as an alternative to the NSCR.

Carmona Line
A spur line towards Carmona was opened on April 1, 1973, to serve the residents of the San Pedro–Carmona Resettlement Project. On September 11, 1976, two Rail Commuter services were designated on the line and were named after indigenous flora. The service from Carmona to Manila was called Ilang-Ilang while the returning service was called Sampaguita. The Carmona services ended by early 2005. The closure coincided with court cases filed in 1996 against the Philippine National Railways by private corporations that owned some of the right-of-way and was ruled out in 2008, as PNR continued to own the tracks. Parts of the line remain intact, and plans to reopen the line are underway.

Shuttle Service
The Shuttle Service was introduced on January 27, 2014. This service uses Hyundai Rotem DMUs and JR KiHa 52.  There are 4 routes of the Shuttle Service, where trains stop at all stations along the routes.
 Tutuban – Sucat
 Sucat – Tutuban
 Sta. Mesa – Sucat
 Sucat – Sta. Mesa

This train service was removed last May 23, 2014 to give way to maintenance servicing of the rolling stock. Another reason was the 3 consecutive weeks of delays and cancellations of some train trips. The service officially returned to the line on August 1, 2018, this time, to serve from the 10th Avenue railway station up to the Dela Rosa station using a JR KiHa 350 DMU. An additional service was opened on September 10 and operated from the reopened Caloocan station to FTI station. It is now the PNR Metro North Commuter.

Premiere Train
The Premiere Train was a special MSC service that operates from Monday to Friday, except holidays. The train being used in this special service was the KiHa 59 "Kogane" train set, which is also from Japan. The train used to stop at selected stations only, namely Tutuban, Blumentritt, España, Sta. Mesa, Buendia, Pasay Road, EDSA (flagstop), Sucat, Alabang, San Pedro, Biñan, and Santa Rosa. The service had 4 trips: MSC501, MSC702, MSC1555, and MSC1802.

It was first opened in March 2014, but it only ran from Tutuban to Santa Rosa. In May 2014, Kogane was replaced by 203 series EMU coaches due to high passenger demand. The service now stops at all stations and ran from Mondays to Saturday.

It was then extended to Mamatid, then to Calamba.

The service was suspended in December 2014 due to the inauguration of the station building of Calamba, and due to the repairs of the trainset being used for this service.

IRRI services (Metro South Commuter)

Tutuban/Dela Rosa-IRRI
On December 1, 2019, Train services to the International Rice Research Institute inside the campus of the University of the Philippines Los Baños were started. Five new stations were added to the route: Pansol and Masili in Calamba Laguna, and Los Baños, college and IRRI in the neighboring town of Los Baños.

The service uses the Kogane train set previously used for Premiere Train Services. The service originates from Tutuban exclusively on Sundays, while it starts from Dela Rosa from Monday to Saturday. The train only loads a limited number of passengers in Dela Rosa, FTI, Bicutan, Sucat and Alabang Stations when going southbound, but unloading in stations in between like Nichols and EDSA are allowed.

The service ended in 2020 following the COVID-19 pandemic.

Alabang-Calamba-IRRI
On December 16, 2019, Regular Commuter services between Alabang, Calamba and IRRI were launched. The service uses Kiha-350 DMUs and runs the full route thrice daily from both endpoints and twice from the Calamba-IRRI segment. The service ended in 2020 following the COVID-19 pandemic.

Fares and ticketing
The PNR Metro Commuter Line uses a distance-based fare system. Currently, the rail operator charges ₱1.07 per kilometer. Fares are 20-percent lower for passengers of non-air-conditioned trains. Additionally, senior citizens and persons with disability are also given 20-percent discount.

PNR issues paper tickets manually. Passengers caught without tickets, or short-ticketed, are charged the farthest distance fare of the service.

Expansion and reconstruction plans

North–South Commuter Railway

The North–South Commuter Railway will be a train line connecting the northern and southern boundaries of Mega Manila. Once fully operational by 2025, it will connect New Clark City in Capas, Tarlac to the north and Calamba, Laguna to the south. The line will initially have 34 stations, expandable to 41 by 2030, and expand northward to Tarlac City and southward to Batangas City by 2040. The line will have commuter rail services as well as an airport limited express service connecting Clark International Airport with Alabang station.

It will be a double-track line with direct current electrification through overhead lines. The line will also be built in the wider  compared to the  narrow gauge being used by PNR. The NSCR North which will be between Tutuban and New Clark City will be fully elevated and will have both embankment and viaduct sections. while the NSCR South will feature a mix of elevated sections through viaducts, as well as an at-grade and underground section between EDSA and FTI stations. The project costs ₱777.5 billion (US$15 billion) and is one of the flagship projects of the Build! Build! Build! Infrastructure Plan.

On July 16, 2019, PNR ordered 104 EM10000 class train cars from the Japan Transport Engineering Company (J-TREC) along with Sumitomo Corporation, which will be arranged into 8-car electric multiple units. This is the first order out of a total of 464 EMU cars. J-TREC and Sumitomo were again awarded on January 14, 2022, for the procurement of 304 train cars (38 sets) in a separate contract. An order of 56 cars (7 sets) for the airport express train are being procured as of 2022.

In November 2021, PNR planned to relocate its present tracks while the NSCR South is being constructed. This was to ensure that the Metro Commuter services would remain business as usual. The line was planned to be upgraded from the present  and  rails to the UIC60 standard but would have been reduced from double-track to single-track with passing sidings as the NSCR will become the primary passenger rail corridor up to Calamba station. As part of the project, 13 new bridges were to be constructed and the line would have remained using the existing narrow-gauge track, though allowances for future conversion to standard-gauge and reintroduction of double-tracking were incorporated into the designs. However, on August 17, 2022, PNR cancelled the procurement for these projects due to these being "no longer feasible".

Metro North Commuter restoration
Metro North Commuter services have been restored in 2018, and there are plans to further extend the line north to Valenzuela station from its present terminus in Governor Pascual station in neighboring Malabon. A new bridge crossing the Tullahan River will also be built to connect the two stations. The expansion aims to reduce traffic congestion between Valenzuela and Makati. Although these services are planned to be superseded by the North–South Commuter Railway, the present line will continue serving passenger trains and will also serve freight trains in the future, as the North Long Haul line. Under the revitalized plans to reach Ilocos and its old terminus in La Union, it will be funded through Public-Private Partnership.

Integration with intercity services
The intercity section of the PNR South Main Line will be rebuilt under the PNR South Long Haul project. A new  line will connect Metro Manila with the Bicol Region. The entire section will also be built in standard gauge, similar to the NSCR but there will be no electrification. The line will also traverse the present Metro Commuter Line, initially from Calamba station by Phase 1, Sucat station by Phase 4, and eventually to Tutuban station. Since the intercity services will traverse the narrow-gauge line, there will be a dual gauge network between these stations and IRRI station.

Incidents and accidents

The PNR Metro Commuter Line has been prone to numerous incidents, including stoning incidents, people being run over by trains (including even fatal ones), and trains colliding with vehicles.
 On May 19, 2014, a cigarette vendor died while six others were hurt when a PNR train from Tutuban Station collided with a jeepney across the railroad tracks along G. Tuazon Street in Sampaloc, Manila at around 4:30 p.m. The driver of the jeepney was allegedly drunk when the collision happened.
 On April 29, 2015, a Hyundai Rotem DMU derailed between EDSA railway station and Nichols railway station. There were 80 reported injuries, mostly minor cases. The incident was caused by missing parts of the railtracks that were stolen. This, however, prompted PNR operations to be suspended on May 5, 2015, to conduct safety tests by PNR and TÜV Rheinland. The operations of the PNR resumed on July 23, 2015.
 On January 12, 2016, a PNR Metro South Commuter Line train from Alabang collided with a jeepney at the Pedro Gil Street crossing near Paco station in Paco, Manila. One person died from head injuries and six were injured.
 On July 7, 2017, five people, including a pregnant woman, was hurt when an ambulance was hit by a train (a PNR 900 class locomotive and a 203 series EMU) near Blumentritt Station in Manila. The ambulance, which came from Barangay 167 Ilano in Caloocan, was on its way to a hospital to bring the pregnant woman when the accident occurred.
On January 14, 2018, a passenger in a 203 series trainset forced a train door open while the train was moving.
 On October 11, 2019, an old woman got run over by a train, causing injuries to her hands and legs.
 Fourteen stoning incidents were reported from December 2 to 21, 2019, including a stoning incident in one 8000 class train.
 On December 28, 2019, an 8000 class was obstructed between España and Sta. Mesa stations.
 On January 1, 2020, a windshield of a Hyundai Rotem DMU was shattered due to a stoning incident while performing an MNC Trip at Caloocan. The glass window was replaced with polycarbonate the day after the incident. It was also found that a group of minors were the ones who did the crime.
 In February 2020, a window in a KiHa 59 series (Kogane) trainset shattered due to a stoning incident.
 On February 16, 2020, a 203 series trainset was involved in a stone-throwing incident. It damaged a door window and injured one passenger.
 On June 3, 2020, a Hyundai Rotem DMU rammed a car at Abad Santos Railroad Crossing in Tondo, Manila. The crossing barrier was not down when the accident happened. The train dragged the car for about 10 meters.
 On August 28, 2020, an engineer got run over by an 8100 class train near Paco station. The engineer died after the incident.
 On August 22, 2021, three teenagers died after they got run over by a train in Santa Mesa, Manila.
 On September 2, 2021, a Hyundai Rotem DMU train rammed a blue car at the Piy Margal Railroad Crossing in Manila despite early warning by the crossing keepers. No injuries were reported. The PNR management is yet to release a statement about the absence of barriers at the railroad crossing, particularly at the southbound lane.
On April 12, 2022, a 9-to-12-year-old child died after being run over by 921 hauling a 203 series EMU train at the intersection of Antipolo Street and Ipil Street in Santa Cruz, Manila.
On September 25, 2022, a DMU train collided with a crane while performing a MNC service in Sta. Mesa, Manila, causing three injuries and damages to the front cab of the train.
On February 11, 2023, a motorcycle rider suddenly crossed the railroad crossing in Tayuman, Manila when a DEL class locomotive is about to cross the railroad crossing.

Notes

References

External links
 The PNR Metro Commuter Line – Timetables

Metro South Commuter Line
Public transportation in the Philippines
Rail transportation in Metro Manila
Transportation in Luzon
Transportation in Manila